The Coat of Arms of Greater Manchester Metropolitan County Council was granted to the Greater Manchester County Council upon its formation in 1974 by the College of Arms. The county council was abolished as a consequence of the Local Government Act 1985 which rendered the arms as being no longer officially in use.

Description
The blazon of the arms is described as follows:

Shield: The shield bears ten turrets in gold, representing the ten districts of the County, on a red ground.
Supporters: The shield is supported on each side by a lion rampant in gold. Each lion bears on its shoulder a badge in red, the lion on the right of the shield bearing a badge with a French horn, representing music and culture, and the lion on the left of the shield bearing a badge with an open book, representing learning and academic life of the County.
Crest: The helm is surmounted by a demi-lion carrying a banner bearing ten small turrets in gold on a red ground.
Motto: "Ever Vigilant".

Today

Although the coat of arms is no longer in use by authorities, variant segments of the arms are still used today, such as the badge of the Greater Manchester Fire and Rescue Service whose arms bear a defaced version of the shield without the gold crenellations trim, and the crest which is also used by the Greater Manchester Army Cadet Force, a demi-lion carrying the banner. A banner based on the shield from these arms was also sometimes used as the flag to represent the area.

The current Greater Manchester Combined Authority does not use the symbols of the former Greater Manchester Council, instead using a wordmark consisting of its initials and full title.

References

See also
Flag of Greater Manchester

Greater Manchester
History of Greater Manchester
Greater Manchester
Manchester Greater
Manchester Greater
Manchester Greater
Manchester Greater
Greater Manchester